The 2023 Bassetlaw District Council election will take place on 4 May, 2023, to elect all 48 members of Bassetlaw District Council in England. The election will take place on the same day as other local elections in England as part of the 2023 United Kingdom local elections.

The previous Bassetlaw District Council election occurred in 2019 and resulted in the Labour Party winning 37 seats and retaining control of the council with an increased majority. The Conservative Party suffered a heavy defeat and was reduced to just 5 seats, a historic low. The Conservatives have subsequently improved their position to 8 seats following a series of by-election gains.

Background
Bassetlaw is a shire district in Nottinghamshire, England. It is predominantly rural, with two towns: Worksop and Retford. The district was formed in 1974 by the Local Government Act 1972. Local Government in Nottinghamshire is organised on a two-tier basis, with local district councils responsible for local services such as housing, local planning and refuse collection and Nottinghamshire County Council responsible for "wide-area" services, including education, social services and public transport. Bassetlaw District Council has been controlled by Labour for most of its existence, except for a brief period from 2006 to 2011 when it was controlled by the Conservatives.

Bassetlaw is divided into 25 wards for electoral purposes, with each ward electing between one and three councillors. Until 2015, the council was elected by thirds, with district elections being held every year except the year in which elections to Nottinghamshire County Council took place. The council resolved in 2014 to hold all-out elections from 2015 onwards, with all 48 councillors elected in all-out elections every four years.

Result

Candidates
Asterisks denote incumbent Councillors seeking re-election.

Beckingham

Blyth

Carlton

Clayworth

East Markham

East Retford East

East Retford North

East Retford South

East Retford West

Everton

Harworth

Langold

Misterton

Rampton

Ranskill

Sturton

Sutton

Tuxford and Trent

Welbeck

Worksop East

Worksop North

Worksop North East

Worksop North West

Worksop South

Worksop South East

References

2023 English local elections
2023